"" ("Hymn" or "Anthem") is the national anthem of Hungary. The lyrics were written by Ferenc Kölcsey, a nationally renowned poet, in 1823, and its currently official musical setting was composed by the romantic composer Ferenc Erkel in 1844, although other less-known musical versions exist. The poem bore the subtitle "A magyar nép zivataros századaiból" ("From the stormy centuries of the Hungarian nation"); it is often argued that this subtitle – by emphasising past rather than contemporary national troubles – was added expressly to enable the poem to pass Habsburg censorship. The full meaning of the poem's text is evident only to those well acquainted with Hungarian history. The first stanza is sung at official ceremonies and as well in common. It was de facto used as hymn of the Kingdom of Hungary from its composition in 1844, and was officially adopted as national anthem of the Third Hungarian Republic in 1989.

The lyrics of "Himnusz" are a prayer beginning with the words .

Title
The title in the original manuscript is "Hymnus" — a Latin word meaning "song of praise", and one which is widely used in languages other than English (e.g., French or German) to mean "anthem". The phonetic transcription "Himnusz" replaced the original Latin spelling over time, and as the poem gained widespread acceptance as the de facto anthem of Hungary, so too the word "himnusz" took on the meaning "national anthem" for other countries as well.

History
Although Kölcsey completed the poem on 22 January 1823, it was only published first in 1829 in Károly Kisfaludy's Aurora, without the subtitle, despite it being part of the manuscript. It subsequently appeared in a collection of Kölcsey's works in 1832, this time with the subtitle. A competition for composers to make the poem suitable to be sung by the public was staged in 1844 and won by Erkel's entry. His version was first performed in the National Theatre (where he was conductor) in July 1844, then in front of a larger audience on 10 August 1844, at the inaugural voyage of the steamship Széchenyi. By the end of the 1850s it became customary to sing Himnusz at special occasions either alongside Vörösmarty's Szózat or on its own.

In the early 1900s, various members of the Hungarian Parliament proposed making the status of Himnusz as the national anthem of Hungary within Austria-Hungary official, but their efforts never got enough traction for such a law to be passed. Later, in the 1950s, Rákosi made plans to have the anthem replaced by one more suited to the Communist ideology, but the poet and composer he had in mind for the task, Illyés and Kodály, both refused. It wasn't until 1989 that Erkel's musical adaptation of Himnusz finally gained official recognition as Hungary's national anthem, by being mentioned as such in the Constitution of Hungary.

Official uses
The public radio station Kossuth Rádió plays Himnusz at ten minutes past midnight each day at the close of transmissions in the AM band, as do the state TV channels at the end of the day's broadcasts. Himnusz is also traditionally played on Hungarian television at the stroke of midnight on New Year's Eve.

Alternative anthems
"Szózat", which starts with the words  (To your homeland be faithful steadfastly, O Hungarian) enjoys a social status nearly equal to that of "Himnusz", even though only "Himnusz" is mentioned in the Constitution of Hungary. Traditionally, Himnusz is sung at the beginning of ceremonies, and Szózat at the end (although the Himnusz, resembling a Protestant Chorale, is substantially easier to sing than the difficult rhythm of the Szózat, which is often only played from recording).

Recognition is also given to the "Rákóczi March", a short wordless piece (composer unknown, but sometimes attributed to János Bihari and Franz Liszt) which is often used on state military occasions; and the poem Nemzeti dal written by Sándor Petőfi.

Another popular song is the "Székely Himnusz", an unofficial ethnic anthem of the Hungarian-speaking Szekler living in Eastern Transylvania, the Székely Land (now part of Romania) and in the rest of the world.

Lyrics
The first stanza is officially sung at ceremonies.

Two English versions are given below; both are free translations of the Hungarian words. As Hungarian is a genderless language, masculine pronouns in the English translations are in fact addressed to all Hungarians regardless of gender.

Himnusz sculpture 

On 7 May 2006, a sculpture was inaugurated for Himnusz at Szarvas Square, Budakeszi, a small town close to Budapest. It was created by Mária V. Majzik, an artist with the Hungarian Heritage Award, depicting the full text of the poem in a circle, centered around a two metres high bronze figure of God, with 21 bronze bells in seven arches between eight pieces of stone, each four and a half metres high. The musical form of the poem can be played on the bells. The cost of its construction, 40 million forints (roughly 200,000 USD), was collected through public subscription.

Notes

References

External links 

 Hungary: Himnusz - Audio of the national anthem of Hungary, with information and lyrics (archive link)
 National and historical symbols of Hungary  has a page about the anthem, featuring a vocal sound file.
 Sheet Music is available at the Hungarian Electronic Library website.
 Hungarian Anthem on Music Keyboard 2.4

1823 poems
1844 compositions
1844 songs
European anthems
Hungarian culture
Hungarian patriotic songs
National anthems
National symbols of Hungary
National anthem compositions in E-flat major